Brachypalpoides is a genus of hoverflies, from the family Syrphidae, in the order Diptera.

Species
B. flavifacies (Shiraki, 1930)
B. lentus (Meigen, 1822)
B. simplex (Shiraki, 1930)

References

Hoverfly genera
Eristalinae